Solace (stylized in all lowercase) is the debut extended play by American rapper Earl Sweatshirt. It was uploaded to his unofficial YouTube channel dar Qness on April 28, 2015. Sweatshirt describes this release as "music from when [he] hit the bottom and found something". Solace is dedicated to Sweatshirt's mother, and lyrical themes include drugs, insomnia, depression, losing friends, and missing his grandmother.

Critical reaction
Upon release, Solace received critical acclaim. Vice's Noisey called it "beautiful", Spin called it "whoozy and complicated". Pitchfork gave it a positive review calling it "a tranquil 10-minute rap suite" that "seeks out a glimmer of hope in the dark" and that "Earl grasps the great distance of loved ones, even when he sees them so close."

Track listing

References 

Earl Sweatshirt albums
2015 singles
2015 EPs